The Siebel Si 202 Hummel ("Bumble-bee") was a German light sportsplane of the late 1930s. It was an angular low-wing monoplane, which could be powered by a variety of small engines.

Design and development

In January 1937 Major Werner Junck, chief of the LC II, the technical wing of the Reichsluftfahrtministerium responsible for the development of new aircraft, informed various minor aircraft manufacturers such as Flugzeugwerke Halle, which later in the year would become Siebel, Bücker, Fieseler, Gothaer Waggonfabrik and Klemm that they would not get any contracts for the development of military aircraft. He therefore advised them to concentrate in the development of a Volksflugzeug or a small twin-engined plane. As a result, Flugzeugwerke Halle developed the Si 202, while the other companies produced the Kl 105, the Fi 253, the Bü 180 and the Go 150.

The Hummel was a small single-engined low-wing cantilever monoplane with side-by-side seating for two, designed to accept a variety of low powered engines of either radial or in-line arrangement.  It was aimed at the sports and club market.  Most variants had sharply clipped wing and tail surfaces, giving the Hummel an attractively angular appearance compared with its contemporaries.

Structurally, the Hummel was a wooden aircraft.  The wing were built around a wooden monospar with plywood covered leading edges and ailerons, with fabric covering elsewhere.  The fuselage was a plywood covered wooden structure, as were the fixed tail surfaces, rudder and elevators being fabric covered.  The horizontal tail surfaces were set noticeably aft of the rudder, rather like the more recent Piper PA-28. The enclosed cabin had dual controls, a single central control column being shared via horizontal extensions.  There was a generous baggage space behind the seats.  The fixed undercarriage had main wheels on split axles, with low pressure tyres and brakes. There was a sprung tailskid.

The first prototype D-ESFH had a nine-cylinder radial Salmson 9Ad motor of 36 kW (45 hp), and began flight testing in May 1938.  For a light aircraft, there was a surprising number of prototypes (at least seven), mostly exploring different engine installations. The engines of the three main variants are given below; the third prototype used a 46 kW (62 hp) Walter Mikron II four-cylinder in-line air-cooled motor.

On 6 February the same pilot set another record with just the pilot aboard, reaching .

At least 17 Hummels, including the prototypes, appeared on the German civil list before the start of World War II and 8 more on the Hungarian list. A total of 66 Hummels of all variants had been completed by the time production ended in March 1941.

Variants
from
Si 202a: 36 kW (45 hp) nine-cylinder radial Salmson 9Ad
Si 202b: 41 kW (55 hp) four-cylinder in-line air-cooled Zundapp 9-092
Si 202c: 45 kW (60 hp) four-cylinder in-line air-cooled Hirth HM 515.  This variant had slightly extended and noticeably rounded tips to wings and tail surfaces.

Operators

Royal Hungarian Air Force

Specifications (Si 202A)

References

1930s German sport aircraft
Siebel aircraft
Single-engined tractor aircraft
Low-wing aircraft
Aircraft first flown in 1938